Mizoram is a state in Northeast India, with Aizawl as its seat of government and capital city. The name of the state is derived from "Mizo", the self-described name of the native inhabitants, and "Ram", which in the Mizo language means "land." Thus "Mizo-ram" means "land of the Mizos". Within India's northeast region, it is the southernmost landlocked state, sharing borders with three of the Seven Sister States, namely Tripura, Assam and Manipur. The state also shares a  border with the neighbouring countries of Bangladesh and Myanmar.

Like several other northeastern states of India, Mizoram was previously part of Assam until 1972, when it was carved out as a Union Territory. In 1986 the Indian Parliament adopted the 53rd amendment of the Indian Constitution, which allowed for the creation of the State of Mizoram on 20 February 1987, as India's 23rd state.

According to a 2011 census, in that year Mizoram's population was 1,091,014. It is the 2nd least populous state in the country. Mizoram spans over an area of approximately 21,087 square kilometres, of which approximately 91% is forested.

About 95% of Mizoram's population descends from a diverse tribal origin. Mizos first began to settle the area in the 16th century, coming in waves of immigration from Southeast Asia. This immigration lasted through the 18th century. Among all of the states of India, Mizoram has the highest concentration of tribal people. The Mizoram people are currently protected under the Indian constitution as a Scheduled Tribe. Mizoram is one of three states of India with a Christian majority (87%). Its people belong to various Christian denominations, being mostly Presbyterians in the north and Baptists in the south.

Mizoram is a highly literate agrarian economy. Slash-and-burn jhum, or shifting cultivation, is the most common form of farming, though it gives poor crop yields. In recent years, the jhum farming practices have been steadily replaced with a significant horticulture and bamboo products industry. About 20% of Mizoram's population lives below the poverty line, with 35% rural poverty as of 2014. The state has about 871 kilometres of national highways, with NH–54 and NH–150 connecting it to Assam and Manipur respectively. It is also a growing transit point for trade with Myanmar and Bangladesh.

Etymology
The term Mizoram is derived from two Mizo words-Mizo and ram. 'Mizo' is the name used to call the native inhabitants and 'Ram' means 'land'. There is a dispute on the term 'zo'. According to one view, 'zo' means 'highland' (or hill) and Mizoram means 'land of the Mizos'. B. Lalthangliana says 'zo' may also mean 'cold region' and therefore, Mizo may also signify people of the cold region.

History

The origin of the Mizos, like those of many other tribes in the northeastern India, is shrouded in mystery. The people living in the Mizo Hills were generally referred to as the Cucis or Kukis by their neighbouring ethnic groups which was also a term adopted by the British writers. The claim that 'The Kukis are the earliest known residents of the Mizo hills area,' must be read in this light. The majority of the tribes classified as "Mizo" today most likely migrated to their present territories from the neighbouring countries in several waves, starting around 1500 CE.

Before the British Raj, the various Mizo clans lived in autonomous villages. The tribal chiefs enjoyed an eminent position in the gerontocratic Mizo society. The various clans and subclans practised slash-and-burn, locally called jhum cultivation - a form of subsistence agriculture. The chiefs were the absolute rulers of their respective clans' territories (ram), although they remained under the nominal political jurisdictions of the Rajas of Manipur, Tripura and Burma.

Prior to 1895, the year that the British Raj gained political control over Mizoram, there were many reports of head-hunting in the Mizoram area via tribal raids led by the village chieftains. Head-hunting was a practice which often involved the ambushing of a rival tribe, the taking of slaves and the cutting off of the heads of the defenders. These heads would sometimes be displayed at the entrances to the tribal village of the victors.

British era (1840s to 1940s)
Some of the earliest records of raids and intertribal conflicts are from the early 19th century. In the 1840s, Captain Blackwood of Britain marched into the Mizo Hills with his troops to punish a Palian tribal chief for raiding British interests in India. A few years later, Captain Lester was wounded in a battle with the Lusei tribe in the region that is now Mizoram. In 1849, a Lusei tribal raid killed 29 members of the Thadou tribe and added 42 captives to their clan. Colonel Lister retaliated in 1850, with the co-operation of the Thadou tribe, an event historically called the First British invasion, burning down a Lusei village of 800 tribal houses and freeing 400 Thadou captives. British historical records on the Mizo Hills state that similar inter-ethnic tribal raids continued for decades after the First British Invasion. Such raids would be for the purpose of seeking out loot, slaves or retaliation for earlier lost battles.

The Mizo Hills formally became part of British India in 1895, and practices such as head-hunting were banned in Mizoram as well as neighbouring regions. The northern and southern Mizo Hills became the Lushai Hills, with Aizawl as their headquarters by declaring the whole area as an "excluded area" (a term sometimes used interchangeably with "backward tract") till India got independence from the British. At the time of the British conquest, there were around 60 chiefs. After Christian missionaries arrived with the gospel, the majority of the population became Christians in the first half of the 20th century.

Post 1947
By the time India gained independence from the British Empire, the number of tribal chiefs had increased to over 200. The educated elites among the Mizos campaigned against the tribal chiefdoms under the banner of the Mizo Union. As a result of their campaign, the hereditary rights of the 259 chiefs were abolished under the Assam-Lushai District ("Acquisition of Chief's Rights") Act, 1954. Village courts were re-implemented in the Mizo region along with other parts of Assam. Few Christian missionaries came to Mizoram during the colonial period knowing that the rural hill population was busy fighting among different tribes. The missionaries propagated Christianity with the support of the British government. As a result, majority converted to Christianity and changed their faiths without any resistance. The Mizos were particularly dissatisfied with the government's inadequate response to the 1959–60 mautam famine. The Mizo National Famine Front, a body formed for famine relief in 1959, later developed into a new political organisation, the Mizo National Front (MNF) in 1961. A period of protests and armed insurgency followed in the 1960s, which resulted in the MNF seeking independence from India. The Mizo insurgents were getting funded and sponsored by then East Pakistan and China. However, the turmoil for secession from India staged by MNF failed to garner any public support or participation from people. In an attempt to counter these insurgency threats, the Indian government bombed state areas affected with insurgency (which is the only known bombing of India on its own soil) on 5 March 1966. Four French-built Dassault Ouragan Fighter Jets (nicknamed Toofani) of the Indian Air Force and British hunters from Tezpur, Kumbhirgram and Jorhat in Assam were deployed to Aizawl (the heart of Mizoram) and other areas as a part of the operation, which continued until 13 March.

In 1971, the government agreed to convert the Mizo Hills into a Union Territory, which became Mizoram in 1972. Following the Mizoram Peace Accord (1986) between the Government and the MNF, Mizoram was declared a full-fledged state of India in 1987. Mizoram was given two seats in the Parliament, one each in the Lok Sabha and in the Rajya Sabha.

After the statehood of Mizoram, the region has benefited considerably from the creation of a Central University, High Court Bench and autonomous districts for tribes.

Geography

Mizoram is a landlocked state in North East India whose southern part shares 722 kilometres long international borders with Myanmar and Bangladesh, and northern part share domestic borders with Manipur, Assam and Tripura. It extends from 21°56'N to 24°31'N, and 92°16'E to 93°26'E. The tropic of cancer runs through the state nearly at its middle. The maximum north–south distance is 285 km, while maximum east–west stretch is 115 km.

Mizoram is a land of rolling hills, valleys, rivers and lakes. As many as 21 major hill ranges or peaks of different heights run through the length and breadth of the state, with plains scattered here and there. About 76% of the state is covered by forests, 8% is fallows land, 3% is barren and considered uncultivable area, while cultivable and sown area constitutes the rest. Slash-and-burn or jhum cultivation, though discouraged, remains in practice in Mizoram and affects its topography. A report by Ministry of Environment, Forest and Climate Change in 2021 states that Mizoram has the highest forest cover as a percentage of its geographical area of any Indian state, being 84.53% forest.

Mizoram terrain is, according to the Geological Survey of India, an immature topography, and the physiographic expression consists of several almost north–south longitudinal valleys containing series of small and flat hummocks, mostly anticlinal, parallel to sub-parallel hill ranges and narrow adjoining synclinal valleys with series of topographic highs. The general geology of western Mizoram consists of repetitive succession of Neogene sedimentary rocks of the Surma Group and Tipam Formation such as sandstone, siltstone, mudstone and rare pockets of shell limestone. The eastern part is the Barail Group. Mizoram lies in seismic zone V, according to the India Meteorological Department; as with other northeastern states of India, this means the state has the highest risk of earthquakes relative to other parts of India.

The biggest river in Mizoram is Chhimtuipui, also known as Kaladan (or Kolodyne). It originates in Chin state in Burma and passes through Saiha and Lawngtlai districts in the southern tip of Mizoram, goes back to Burma's Rakhine state. Although many more rivers and streams drain the hill ranges, the most important and useful rivers are the Tlawng, Tut, Tuirial and Tuivawl which flow through the northern territory and eventually join the Barak River in Cachar District. The rivers have a gentle drainage gradient particularly in the south.

The lake is situated in Saiha district of southern Mizoram. It is believed that the lake was created as a result of an earthquake or a flood. The local people believe that a submerged village remains intact deep under the waters. Legend has it that a huge mustard plant once stood in this place. When the plant was cut down, jets of water sprayed from the plant and created a pool of water, thus the lake was named Ţam Dil which means of 'lake of mustard plant'. Today the lake is an important tourist attraction and a holiday resort. The most significant lake in Mizo history, Rih Dil, is ironically located in Burma, a few kilometres from the Indo-Burma border. It was believed that departed souls pass through this lake before making their way to Pialral or heaven. Mizoram is also called a "peninsula state" as it is surrounded by international borders on three sides.

Climate
The region is influenced by monsoons, raining heavily from May to September with little rain in the dry (cold) season. The state is in a region where cyclones and landslides can cause weather-related emergencies.

Biodiversity

Mizoram has the third highest total forest cover with  hectares ( acres), and highest percentage area (90.68%) covered by forests, among the states of India, according to 2011 Forest Survey of India. Tropical semi-evergreen, tropical moist deciduous, subtropical broadleaved hill and subtropical pine forests are the most common vegetation types found in Mizoram. Bamboo is common in the state, typically intermixed with other forest vegetation; about 9,245 km2 (44%) of the state's area is bamboo bearing. The state and central governments of India have cooperated to reserve and protect 67% of the land covered by forests, and additional 15% by management. Only 17% of the land is non-forested area for cultivation, industry, mining, housing and other commercial human activity. Satellite data suggests 91% of state's geographical area is covered by forests.

Jhum cultivation, or slash-and-burn practice, was a historic tradition in Mizoram and a threat to its forest cover. This practice has reduced in recent decades, due to a government-supported initiative to support horticultural crops such as pineapple and banana plantations.

Mizoram is host to numerous species of birds, wildlife and flora. About 640 species of birds have been identified in the state, many of which are endemic to the Himalayan foothills and southeast Asia. Of the birds found in Mizoram forests, 27 are on the worldwide threatened species lists and eight are on the critically endangered list. Prominent birds spotted in Mizoram include those from the families of Phasianidae, Anatidae, Ciconiidae, Threskiornithidae, Ardeidae, Pelecanidae, Phalacrocoracidae, Falconidae, Accipitridae, Otididae, Rallidae, Heliornithidae, Turnicidae, Burhinidae, Charadriidae, Scolopacidae, Jacanidae, Laridae, Columbidae, Psittacidae, Cuculidae, Strigidae, Caprimulgidae, Apodidae, Alcedinidae, Meropidae, Bucerotidae, Ramphastidae, Picidae, Pittidae, Laniidae, Campephagidae, Dicruridae, Corvidae, Paridae, Hirundinidae, Cisticolidae, Pycnonotidae, Sylviidae, Timaliidae, Sittidae, Sturnidae, Turdidae, Dicaedae, Chloropseidae, Ploceidae, Motacillidae, Fringillidae, Nectariniidae and Muscicapidae. Each of these families have many species.

The state is also host to a variety of fauna, just like its sister northeastern Indian states. Mammal species observed in the Mizoram forests include slow loris (Nycticebus coucang), red serow (Capricornis rubidus), which is the state animal, goral (Nemorhaedus goral), tiger (Panthera tigris), leopard (Panthera pardus), clouded leopard ("Neofelis nebulosi"), leopard cat (Prionailurus bengalensis), Bengal fox (Vulpes bengalensis), and Asiatic black bear (Ursus thibetanus). Primates seen include stump-tailed macaque (Macaca arctoides), hoolock gibbon (Hylobates hoolock), Phayre's leaf monkey (Trachypithecus phayrei) and capped langur (Trachypithecus pileatus). The state is also home to many reptiles, amphibians, fish and invertebrates.

The state has two national parks and six wildlife sanctuaries – Blue Mountain (Phawngpui) National Park, Dampa Tiger Reserve (largest), Lengteng Wildlife Sanctuary, Murlen National Park, Ngengpui Wildlife Sanctuary, Tawi Wildlife Sanctuary, Khawnglung Wildlife Sanctuary, and Thorangtlang Wildlife Sanctuary.

Demographics

Mizoram has a population of 1,091,014 with 552,339 males and 538,675 females. This reflects a 22.8% growth since 2001 census; still, Mizoram is second least populated state of India. The sex ratio of the state is 976 females per thousand males, higher than the national ratio 940. The density of population is 52 persons per square kilometre.

The literacy rate of Mizoram in 2011 was 91.33 per cent, higher than the national average 74.04 per cent, and second best among all the states of India. About 52% of Mizoram population lives in urban areas, much higher than India's average. Over one third of the population of Mizoram lives in Aizawl district, which hosts the capital.

Ethnic groups
The great majority of Mizoram's population consists of several ethnic tribes who are either culturally or linguistically linked. These ethnic groups are collectively known as Mizos (Mi means People, Zo meaning the name of a progenitor; Mizo thus is People of Zo origin). Mizo people are spread throughout the northeastern states of India, Burma, and Bangladesh. They belong to numerous tribes; however, to name a particular tribe as the largest is difficult as no concrete census has ever been undertaken.

Sometime in the 16th century CE, the first batch of Mizo crossed Tiau River and settled in Mizoram and they were called as Kukis by Bengalis. The term Kuki mean the inhabitants of the interior and inaccessible mountain tracts. Sometimes grouped as Kuki-Chin tribes, The First batch were called Old Kukis, which are the Biate, Ranglong and the Hrangkhol, and the second batch that followed include Lushei (or Lusei), Paite, Lai, Mara, Ralte, Hmar, Thadou, Shendus, and several other.

The Bru (Reang), Chakma, Tanchangya are some non-Kuki tribes of Mizoram, with some suggestion that some of these are Indo-Aryan in their origins. The Bnei Menashe tribe claim Jewish descent.

The diversity of tribal groups reflects the historical immigration patterns. Different tribes and sub-tribes arrived in the present Mizoram, in successive waves and settled down in different parts of the state. Further, as they arrived, there were raids, fear of raids and intertribal feuds. The resulting isolation and separation created numerous tribes and sub-tribes. The Mizo people usually suffix their descriptive given names with their tribe.

Other than tribal groups, other ethnic groups inhabit Mizoram including Bengalis and Nepalis. Nepali Gorkhas, for example, were encouraged to settle in Aizawl area and other parts of Mizoram during the British colonial times. Thousands of their descendants are now residents of Mizoram.

Protected demographic category

According to 2011 census, Mizoram had 1,036,115 people (95% of total) classified as Scheduled Tribe, the highest concentration of protected tribal people in all states of India. This demographic classification, given to Mizoram tribes since the 1950s, has provided reservations and extra resources in education and government job opportunities, a preferential treatment as a means to accelerate their integration with mainstream society.

Languages

Mizo and English are the official languages of the state. Mizo is the most widely used language for verbal interactions, but English, being important for education, administration, formalities and governance, is widely used. The Duhlian dialect, also known as the Lusei, was the first language of Mizoram and has come to be known as the Mizo language. The language is mixed with other dialects like the Hmar, Mara, Lai, Thadou-Kuki, Paite, Gangte, etc. Christian missionaries developed the Mizo script. Writing is a combination of the Roman Script and Hunterian transliteration methodology with prominent traces of a phonetics-based spelling system. There are 25 letters in the alphabet: A, AW, B, CH, D, E, F, G, NG, H, I, J, K, L, M, N, O, P, R, S, T, Ṭ (with a dot under), U, V, Z.

Religion

The majority (87%) of Mizos are Christians in various denominations, predominantly Presbyterian. Mizoram has a significant Theravada Buddhist population of 8.5%, who are mainly Chakma people, making them the largest religious minority in the region, followed by Hindus at 2.7% according to the 2011 census. There are several thousand people, mostly ethnic Mizo, who have converted to Judaism claiming to be one of the lost Judaic tribe group Bnei Menashe, with descent from the biblical Menasseh. Muslims make up about 1.3% of the state population. The remaining 3,000 people are Sikhs, Jains and other religions.

Christianity

The major Christian denomination is the Mizoram Presbyterian Church, which was established by the Welsh missionary Rev. D. E. Jones starting in 1894. By the time India gained independence from British Empire, some 80% of Lushei tribe people had converted to Christianity. The Mizoram Presbyterian Church is one of the constituted bodies of the General Assembly of the Presbyterian Church of India at Shillong in Meghalaya; it became the dominant Christian group in north Mizoram hills. In the southern hills of Mizoram, the Baptist Church had the dominant following. Other Christian churches present in Mizoram include the United Pentecostal Church, the Salvation Army, the Seventh-day Adventist Church, Church of God (Seventh Day), Mizoram Conference, Kohhran Thianghlim, Roman Catholic, Lairam Isua Krista Baptist Kohhran (LIKBK), Congregational Church of India (Maraland), Evangelical Church of Maraland, Independent Church of India (ICI) and Evangelical Free Church of India (EFCI).

Buddhism

According to 2011 census report there are 93,411 people who follow Buddhism in Mizoram. The Chakmas and Tongchangya or Tanchangya have been Buddhist since the mid-18th century and there are approximately one hundred monasteries (known as vihara in Pali) in Mizoram.

Hinduism

According to the 2011 census, there were 30,136 Hindus in Mizoram or about 2.75% of the population.

Others

There are also a few Mizos who practice Judaism (866 according to the 2001 census) and a modernised traditional Mizo religion called Hnam sakhua, which places a special emphasis on Mizo culture and seeks to revive traditional Mizo values while opposing the influence of Christianity on Mizo people.

A total of 1,367 people practised the Mizo religion according to the 2001 census. This number included, in addition to the original Mizo religion (755 people), adherents of other tribal religions such as Lalchhungkua (279), Lalhnam (122), and Nunna Lalchhungkua (211).

Politics

Originally village land, locally called ram, was the property of the tribal chief. The institution of chieftainship began in the 16th century. Each village behaved like a small state, and the chief was called Lal. The rule was hereditary, and there were no written laws (the first script for Mizo language was developed by Christian Missionaries Lorraine and Savidge about 1895).

After annexation by the British in the 1890s, northern part of Mizoram was administered as the Lushai Hills district of Assam, while southern Mizoram was part of Bengal. In 1898, the southern part was transferred from Bengal to Assam. The colonial power retained the chiefs and Mizo customs, including the socially stratified hereditary transfer of political power. In 1937, under Section 6 of the Scheduled District Act, the British administration consolidated executive and legislative political power to the Deputy Commissioner and District magistrates, with village chiefs in advisory role. The political and judiciary powers of chiefs were neither final nor exclusive, thereafter. Rulings could be appealed to courts staffed with British officials. After India gained independence from the colonial rule, the region was granted autonomous status in 1952, where Mizo people formulated their own laws and delivered judicial decisions. The region was renamed as Mizo District within Assam State in April 1954 and in that year, the institution of hereditary chieftainship was abolished, and instead village courts/council were set up. In the same year the Young Mizo Association was formed which is still an important institution in Mizoram.

The representatives of the Lushai Hills Autonomous District Council and the Mizo Union pleaded with the States Reorganisation Commission (SRC) to integrate the Mizo-dominated areas of Tripura and Manipur with the District Council in Assam. The tribal leaders in the northeast were unhappy with the final SRC recommendations and met in Aizawl in 1955 to form a new political party, Eastern India Tribal Union (EITU). This group raised their demand for a separate state comprising all the hill districts of Assam. However, the demand was not accepted by the government.

In the 1950s, the fears of Assamese hegemony and perceived lack of government concern led to growing discontent among the Mizos. The Mizos were particularly dissatisfied with the government's inadequate response to the 1959–60 mautam famine. The Mizo National Famine Front, a body formed for famine relief in 1959, later developed into a new political organisation, the Mizo National Front (MNF) in 1961. The Front sought sovereign independence for the Mizo territory, staging an armed insurrection with the 28 February 1966 uprising against the government. The revolt was suppressed by the government of India, which carried out airstrikes in Aizawl and surrounding areas. The secessionist Mizo National Front was outlawed in 1967, as the Mizo Union and other organisations continued the demand for a separate Mizo state within the Republic of India.

Assam state was split, re-organised into multiple political regions, Mizo hills area was declared Mizoram after the insurgency, and it received status as a Union Territory in 1972. A Peace Accord was signed between central government and insurgent groups of Mizoram on 30 June 1986. Per the accord, insurgents surrendered their arms and Mizoram became the 23rd state of India in 1986, formalised the following year. The first election of Mizoram Legislative Assembly was held on 16 February 1987. Elections have been held at 5-year intervals since then. The most recent Mizoram elections were held for 40 seats of legislative assembly on 28 November 2018. The voter turnout was 80%. The Mizo National Front led by Zoramthanga was elected to power.

Kambhampati Hari Babu is the governor of Mizoram since July 2021.

Administration

The Mizoram State Legislative Assembly has 40 seats and the Village Councils are the grassroots of democracy and leadership in Mizoram. The state has a chief minister, council of ministers with a portfolio of ministries responsible for different priorities and role of the government.

There are three Autonomous District Councils (ADCs) for ethnic tribes in Mizoram, namely Chakma Autonomous District Council (in the southern part of state, bordering Bangladesh), Lai Autonomous District Council (LADC) for Lai people in the southern part of the state, and Mara Autonomous District Council (MADC) for Mara people in the southern-eastern corner. The Chakma people has been demanding to covert the existing Chakma Autonomous District Council in Mizoram into a Union territory under the name Chakmaland. This is because the predominantly Buddhist Chakma people in Mizoram have faced discrimination by the Mizo people, who are predominantly Christian.

There are eleven districts in Mizoram. A district of Mizoram is headed by a Deputy Commissioner who is in charge of the administration in that particular district. The Deputy Commissioner is the executive head of the district, responsible for implementing government regulations, the law and order situation in the district, as well as being responsible for tax collection for the government.

A Superintendent of Police is responsible for the police administration of each district. These officials work with the village councils in each district.

Economy

The state's gross state domestic product (GSDP) growth rate was nearly 10% annually over 2001-2013 period. As of 2019, the state's GSDP was US$ 3.57 billion. With international borders with Bangladesh and Myanmar, it is an important port state for southeast Asian imports to India, as well as exports from India.

The biggest contributors to state's GSDP growth are Agriculture, Public Administration and Construction work. Tertiary sector of service sector continued to have the contribution to the GSDP with its share hovering between 58 per cent and 60 per cent during the past decade.

As of 2013, according to the Reserve Bank of India, 20.4% of total state population is below poverty line, about same as the 21.9% average for India. Rural poverty is significantly higher in Mizoram, with 35.4% below the poverty line compared to India's rural poverty average of 25.7; while in urban areas of Mizoram, 6.4% are below the poverty line.

Mizoram has a highly literate work force, with literacy rate of nearly 90% and widespread use of English. The state has a total of 4,300 kilometres of roads of which 927 kilometres are high quality national highways and 700 kilometres of state highways. The state is developing its Kolodyne River for navigation and international trade. Mizoram's airport is at the capital city of Aizawl. The state is a power deficit state, with plans to develop its hydroelectric potential. After agriculture, the major employer of its people include handloom and horticulture industries. Tourism is a growth industry. In 2008, the state had nearly 7,000 registered companies. The state government has been implementing Special Economic Zones (SEZs) to encourage economic growth.

Agriculture

Between 55% to 60% of the working population of the state is annually deployed on agriculture. The sector's contribution to the gross state domestic product was 30% in 1994, just 14% in 2009 due to economic growth of other sectors.

Agriculture has traditionally been a subsistence profession in Mizoram. It is seen as a means for generate food for one's family, ignoring its potential for commerce, growth and prosperity. Rice remains the largest crop grown in Mizoram by gross value of output. Fruits have grown to become the second largest category, followed by condiments and spices.

Jhum practice
Before 1947, agriculture in Mizoram predominantly used to be slash-and-burn driven Jhum cultivation. This was discouraged by the state government, and the practice has been slowly declining. A 2012 report estimates the proportion of shifting cultivation area in Mizoram to be about 30% - predominant part of which was for rice production (56% to 63% depending on the year). Despite dedicating largest amount of labour, jhum cultivated and non-jhum crop area to rice, the yields are low; Mizoram average rice yields per acre is about 70% of India's average rice yield per acre and 32% of India's best yield. Mizoram produces about 26% of rice it consumes every year, and it buys the deficit from other states of India.

The crop area used for jhum cultivation rotates in Mizoram; that is, the area slashed and burnt for a crop is abandoned for a few years and then jhumias return to slash and burn the same plot after a few years of non-use. The primary reasons for cyclical jhum cultivation includes, according to Goswami et al., personal, economic, social and physical. Jhum cultivation practice offers low crop yields and is a threat to the biome of Mizoram; they suggest increased government institutional support, shift to higher income horticultural crops, assured supply of affordable food staples for survival as means to further reduce jhum cultivation.

Horticulture

In horticulture and floriculture, Mizoram is a significant producer and global exporter of Anthurium (over 7 million a year) and roses. It is also a significant producer and domestic supplier of banana, ginger, turmeric, passion fruit, orange and chowchow. Mizoram has accomplished this horticulture success and exports in 2009, with just 6% of its cultivated land dedicated to horticulture and floriculture, indicating a large potential for further growth and economic integration with other Indian states as well export driven economy. In 2013, the area dedicated to horticulture and floriculture increased to 9.4% of 1.2 million hectares potential.

The agricultural productivity is very low in Mizoram. The state gets a lot of rain, but its soil is porous and irrigation infrastructure very inadequate; this has affected it crop yield and reliability. The yield issue that can be addressed by building irrigation infrastructure and adoption of better crop technologies. The state also has very low consumption of fertiliser and pesticides, which scholars suggest offers an opportunity for organic farming particularly of vegetables and fruits.

Forestry, fisheries and sericulture
Mizoram is one of the leading producers of bamboo in India, has 27 species of bamboo, and supplies 14% of India's commercial bamboo. Forest products contribute about 5% to the state's gross product. The state produces about 5,200 metric tonnes of fish a year, about 12% of potential that can be sustainably achieved. Sericulture is an important handicraft industry engaged by nearly 8,000 families in over 300 Mizo villages.

Industry
Mizoram faces difficulties in the advancement of industries. Lack of transport infrastructure is one of the major drawbacks. Other problems faced by the state include shortage of electricity, capital, telecommunication and export market access.

Mizoram has two industrial estates at Zuangtui and Kolasib. Another software technology park is being established in Mizoram University campus. The state government has acquired 127 acres of land in Khawnuam for development of the Indo-Myanmar border trade township.

Education infrastructure

The first primary school was set up in 1898 at Aizawl by Christian missionaries. The state has long enjoyed higher literacy rates than average literacy rates for India. In 1961, the literacy was 51%. By 2011 census, it had reached 92%, compared to 74% average for India. Mizoram is second only to Kerala.

There were 3,894 schools in Mizoram as of 2012. Of these, 42% are publicly owned and managed by Central/State governments, 28% are private without government subsidies, 21% are private with government subsidies, and the rest are primary and middle schools that are government financed by run by three Autonomous District Councils of Mizoram. The teacher-pupil ratio is about 1:20 for primary, 1:9 for middle School, 1:13 for high, and 1:15 for higher secondary schools.

There are several educational establishments under the umbrella of the Ministry of Education, including universities, colleges and other institutions. Within Mizoram University, there are 29 undergraduate departments including 2 professional institutions affiliated with the university. The state had 22 other colleges, and the total college enrolment was approximately 10,600 students in 2012. Other well known institutes are National Institute of Technology Mizoram, ICFAI University, Mizoram, College of Veterinary Sciences & Animal Husbandry, Selesih, Aizawl, Mizoram and Regional Institute of Paramedical and Nursing Aizawl.

Energy infrastructure
Mizoram is not self-sufficient in power. In 2012, the state had a demand for 107 MW of power, but had an effective installed capacity of only 29.35 MW. To bridge the gap, it purchased electricity from the national grid.

Of the total installed power generation capacity, all 29.35 MW came from hydel. The state also has 22.92 MW of thermal power and 0.50 MW of Diesel generating set as of March 2012. The thermal and diesel generating stations were kept on standby mode owing to their high cost of operation, and because it was cheaper to buy the power from the national grid than to operate these standby units.

The hydroelectric power potential of Mizoram was assessed to be about 3600 MW in 2010, and about 4500 MW in 2012. If even half of this is realised, the state could supply all its citizens and industry with 24/7 electricity, as well as earn income by selling surplus power to the national grid. The topography of Mizoram hydroelectric resources is ideal for power projects. The following rivers are suited for hydel projects with minimal impact on its biosphere – Tuivai, Tuivawl, Tlawng, Tut, Serlui, Tuirial, Kolodyne, Tuichang, Tuipui, Tiau and Mat. Beyond the major rivers, Mizoram has many small but perennial streams and rivulets with ideal condition for developing micro/mini and small hydroelectric projects. The state has proposed projects to attract private investments on Build, Own, Operate and Transfer (BOOT) basis with financial assistance in rehabilitating its citizens were they to be affected by the project. The largest proposed project is expected to be on Kolodyne (460 MW), and there are dozens of small to micro projects that have been identified.

By 2014, the state had signed memorandums to build and add 835 MW of electricity generation projects – Tuivai SHP with VGF (210 MW) in Champhai district, Kolodyne-II SHP with NHPC (460 MW) in Siaha district, Bairabi with Sikaria Power (80 MW) in Kolasib district, Tuirini with SPNL (38 MW) in Aizawl district, and Tuivawl with SPML as well (42 MW) in Aizawl district.

Transport infrastructure

The state is the southernmost in India's far northeast, placing Mizoram in a disadvantageous position in terms of logistical ease, response time during emergencies, and its transport infrastructure. Prior to 1947, the distance to Kolkata from Mizoram was shorter; but ever since, travel through Bangladesh has been avoided, and traffic loops through Assam an extra 1,400 kilometres to access the economic market of West Bengal. This remoteness from access to economic markets of India is balanced by the state's closeness to southeast Asian market and its over 700 kilometres of international boundary.

Road Network: In 2012, Mizoram had a road network of around  including unsurfaced village roads to surfaced national highways; and there were 106,000 registered motor vehicles. The village roads are primarily single lane or unmetalled tracks that are typically lightly trafficked. Mizoram had 871 kilometres of national highways, 1,663 kilometres of state highways and 2,320 kilometres of surfaced district roads. All of Mizoram's 23 urban centres and 59% of its 764 villages are connected by all weather roads. However, landslide and weather damage to these roads is significant in parts. The state is connected to the Indian network through Silchar in Assam through the National Highway 54. Another highway, NH-150 connects the state's Seling Mizoram to Imphal Manipur and NH-40A links the State with Tripura. A road between Champhai and Tiddim in Burma has been proposed and is awaiting co-operation from the Burmese authorities.

Airport: Mizoram has an airport, Lengpui Airport (IATA: AJL), near Aizawl and its runway is 3,130 feet long at an elevation of 1,000 feet. Aizawl airport is linked from Kolkata – a 60-minute flight. Inclement weather conditions mean that at certain times the flights are unreliable.
Railway: There is a rail link at Bairabi railway station but it is primarily for goods traffic. The nearest practical station to Mizoram is at Silchar in Assam. The Government is now planning to start a broad gauge Bairabi Sairang Railway connection for better connectivity in the state.
Helicopter: A Helicopter service by Pawan Hans has been started which connects the Aizawl with Lunglei, Lawngtlai, Saiha, Chawngte, Serchhip, Champhai, Kolasib, Khawzawl, Mamit and Hnahthial.
Water Ways: Mizoram is in the process of developing water ways with the port of Akyab Sittwe in Burma along its biggest river, Chhimtuipui. It drains into Burma's Rakhine state, and finally enters the Bay of Bengal at Akyab, which is a popular port in Sittwe, Burma. The Indian government considers it a priority to set up inland water ways along this river to trade with Burma. The project is known as the Kaladan Multi-modal Transit Transport Project. State Peace and Development Council of Burma has committed $10 million for the venture. The project is expected to be complete in 2015, and consists of two parts. First, river Kaladan (or Kolodyne, Chhimtuipui) is being dredged and widened from the port at Sittwe to Paletwa, in Chin province, adjacent to Mizoram. This 160 km inland waterway will enable cargo ships to enter, upload and offload freight in Paletwa, Myanmar; this is expected to be complete in 2014. As second part of the project, being constructed in parallel, includes a 62 km two-lane highway from Paletwa (also known as Kaletwa or Setpyitpyin) to Lomasu, Mizoram. Additionally, an all weather multilane 100 km road from Lomasu to Lawngtlai in Mizoram is being built to connect it with the Indian National Highway 54. This part of the project is slated to be complete by 2015. Once complete, this project is expected to economically benefit trade and horticulture exports of Mizoram, as well as improve economic access to 60 million people of landlocked northeast India and Myanmar.

Education

Mizoram schools are run by the state and central government or by private organisation. Instruction is mainly in English and Mizo. Under the 10+2+3 plan, students may enroll in general or professional degree programs after passing the Higher Secondary Examination (the grade 12 examination). Mizoram has one Central University (Mizoram University), one engineering college (National Institute of Technology Mizoram) and one private university (a branch of the Institute of Chartered Financial Analysts of India). A medical college, Zoram Medical College was also inaugurated on 2018 and offer 100 seats for MBBS course.

Culture
The culture of the Mizo tribes and its social structure has undergone tremendous change over 100 years, since the arrival of Christianity in the late 1890s. Contemporary people of Mizoram celebrate Christmas, Easter and other Christian celebrations replacing many of old tribal customs and practices.

The growth of Christianity, scholars state, was shaped from a foundation of cultural, religious and socio-political structure. One such foundation cultural element of Mizo people was Hnatlang, states Hlawndo, which literally means social work, united labour or community labour (the word hna‘ means job or work in the Mizo language; and tlang‘ means together and mutual). The tribal members who were absent from such social work (for reasons other than illness and disability) were penalised – a form of strong peer pressure. Jhum cultivation and raids on neighbouring tribes required Hnatlang, the spirit of united labour and equal sharing of the result.

A consequence of Hnatlang was the culture of Tlawmngaihna, which does not have a direct English translation. Tlawmngaihna as cultural concept incorporates behaviour that is self-sacrificing, self-denying, doing what an occasion demands unselfishly and without concern for inconvenience caused, persevering, stoical, stout-hearted, plucky, brave, firm, independent, loath to lose one's good reputation. Thus, after a fire or landslide or flood damage, the Mizo culture is one of spontaneous humble social work without demands or expectations.

Several other cultural elements of ancient Mizo tribes, some of which became less prevalent after arrival of Christianity, included:
Zawlbuk: a place near the chief's home, which served as defence camp in times of war, as well as "bachelor house" where the youth gathered and centre of village life.
Pathian: the term for god, to whom prayers and hymns were recited. The evil spirits were called ramhuai.
Nula-rim: the method of courtship in ancient culture. Courtship, pre-marital sex and polygamy were accepted. The man and the woman could have many partners. If the woman got pregnant, the man was required either marry or pay a substantial sum called Sawnman. If the woman's parents discover the relationship, they had a right to demand a payment called Khumpuikaiman. While pre-marital sex was accepted, a woman who was virgin at marriage was more highly esteemed than one who wasn't.
Pathlawi: a divorced man.
Ramri lehkha: a boundary drawing that identified a chief's tenured land called ram. Only the chief owned the land, and this ownership was hereditary. The tribe and village worked and harvested the land.

In modern Mizoram, much of the social life often revolves around church. Community establishments exist in urban centres that arrange social events, sports event, musical concerts, comedy shows and other activities.

Traditional festivals

Traditional festivals in Mizoram often revolved around stages of jhum cultivation or the seasons. Community festivals were called kut in the local language, and there were major and minor kuts such as Chapchar Kut, Thalfavang Kut, Mim Kut and Pawl Kut. Chapchar Kut was the festival of spring (February/March), just before jhum started and land was cut-and-burnt for a new crop. Chapchar Kut was most anticipated by youth, a major festival and involved dancing and feasts. Thalfavang Kut celebrated completion of weeding of the jhum crop fields. Mim Kut was the festival dedicated to ancestors after first maize crop was collected, while Pawl Kut celebrated the end of harvest and the start of new year. These festivals slowly disappeared as Christianity became established in Mizoram.

Chapchar Kut was reintroduced and revived in 1973 by Mizo people to celebrate their heritage. Before Christianity arrived in Mizoram, home-brewed alcohol and many meat delicacies were part of the Chapchar celebrations. Now, with Mizoram's state law as a dry state, the youth busy themselves with music and community dancing. Along with reviving traditional festivals, the community has been reviving the traditional dances at these festivals, for example, dances such as Cheraw, Khuallam, Chheihlam and Chai.

Performing arts

Mizoram has many traditional dances, such as:
Cheraw – a dance that involves men holding bamboo close to the floor. They tap the sticks open and close with the rhythm of music. Women in colourful dresses dance on top, stepping in between and out of the bamboo with the music. It requires co-ordination and skill.
Khuallam – a mixed-gender dance that traditionally celebrated successfully hunting with swaying cloth with singing and music.

Chheihlam – typically performed over cool evenings with rice beer, people sit in a circle with two or more dancers in the centre; they sing with impromptu often humorous compositions about recent events or guests between them with music and dancers keeping up. The song was called Chheih Hla. Mizo people have tried to introduce Chheihlam dance during church sermons with controversy.
Chai – an important dance at the Chapchar Kut, this places the musicians in the centre while men and women in colourful dresses alternate and form a circle; the women held the men at their waist, while men held the women at their shoulders; they step forward to move in circles while swaying left and right with the music. A song may be sung which is also called Chai.

Music

Mizo traditional tunes are very soft and gentle, with locals claiming that they can be sung the whole night without the slightest fatigue. The guitar is a popular instrument and Mizos enjoy country style music. Within the church services are drums, commonly used and known locally as "khuang". The "khuang" is made from wood and animal hide and are often beaten enough to instigate a trance-like state with worshipers as they dance in a circular fashion.

Mizos enjoy singing and, even without musical instruments, they enthusiastically sing together, clapping hands or by using other rhythmic methods. Informal instruments are called chhepchher.

Sports

Mizoram's first football league debuted in October 2012. The Mizoram Premiere League had eight teams during the 2012–2013 season and is the highest level league in Mizoram. The eight clubs include Aizawl, Chanmari, Dinthar, FC Kulikawn, Luangmual, Mizoram, RS Annexe, and Reitlang. The season starts each year in October and wraps up with the finals in March.

Tourism

The Foreigners (Protected Areas) Order 1958, a continuation of a protectionist British colonial rule, requires visitors to Mizoram to have one of two passes.

Domestic tourists

The state requires Indian citizens to have an Inner Line Permit. This is available from the Liaison officer, government of Mizoram in Kolkata, Silchar, Shillong, Guwahati and New Delhi.

International tourists

Almost all foreign nationals can get the required Protected Area Permit on arrival, and face the same requirements as domestic tourists. However, they additionally have to register themselves with state police within 24 hours of arrival, a formality that most resorts can provide. Citizens of Afghanistan, China and Pakistan and foreign nationals having their origin in these countries are required to get the pass through the Indian consulate or from the Ministry of Home Affairs in New Delhi, before they arrive in Mizoram.

Attractions
Mizoram is a place with flora and fauna rich landscape and pleasant climate. The tourism ministry regulates the maintenance and upgrade of tourist lodges throughout the state.

The state is a bird watcher's destination. For Mrs. Hume's pheasant (Syrmaticus humiae), Mizoram is a stronghold. Wild water buffalo, Sumatran rhinoceros, elephants and other mammals have been spotted in the past.

Mizoram is also one of few places where a Winterline phenomenon is visible.

Issues

Chakmaland
Chakmaland is the proposed Union territory for the predominantly Buddhist Chakma people in Mizoram. Chakmas have been demanding to convert the existing Chakma Autonomous District Council in Mizoram into a Union territory.

Alcohol prohibition
In 1996, the government of Mizoram banned liquor. The church leaders (Mizoram Kohhran Hruaitute Committee) argue that state government should keep the ban and not seek to amend the law, while others argue prohibition should be lifted. However, it has been difficult to enforce the ban due to the high demand for alcohol.

In 2008, the Mizoram Excise and Narcotics (Wine) Rules amended the ban of 1996 to allow the manufacture, export, sale, possession and consumption of wine in Mizoram made from grapes and guava which would help the economy of the state, reduce fruit waste from farms, and encourage large scale commercialisation. In 2011 the bill was amended to include apple, ginger, passion fruit, peach and pear wine.

In 2013, the state assembly unanimously passed a resolution to study the impact of liquor prohibition. In 2014, the state's narcotics minister noted that the liquor ban had produced some serious problems in Mizo society due to the drinking of spurious and unhealthy (locally made) liquor, known as zu. The government suggested it would introduce an amended liquor bill allowing retail shops to operate in Aizawl and other district headquarters to sell liquor – but not in bars. Furthermore, they would not consult the powerful church on the issue. The amended bill was proposed to be tabled for state legislative assembly discussion after May 2014.

The Mizoram Liquor (Prohibition and Control) Act, 2014 (Act No. 8 of 2014) was enacted on 10 July 2014 which received the assent of the governor of Mizoram on 11 July 2014 repealed the Mizoram Liquor Total Prohibition Act, 1995, except the Mizoram Excise and Narcotics (Wine) Rules, 2008.

The Mizoram Liquor Prohibition and Control bill of 2014 was repealed on 20 March 2019 with the Mizoram Liquor Prohibition Bill 2019, it was a legislation promised by the Mizo National Front.

Rat problems
Every 50 years, the Mautam bamboo blooms and its high-protein seeds lead to an explosion in the black rat population in the jungle, also referred to as the rat flood, which has historically destroyed entire villages' food supplies after rats move on to farm fields and devour crops. The 1958–59 plague provoked a rural uprising during which the indigenous Mizo people launched a violent 20-year rebellion against the central government. The dispute only saw final resolution in 1986. The 48-year rat problem re-occurred in Mizoram over 2006–08. The crops suffered massive damage, with yields at 30-year lows; the crop yields recovered sharply to pre-mautam levels in 2009 after the mautam passed.

Media and communication
See also Newspapers in Mizoram.
Mizoram's media is growing quickly. Internet access is average, and private television cable channels are popular. Doordarshan, the national television service of India provides terrestrial broadcasting services and All India Radio broadcast programmes related to the indigenous culture and local news. Broadband access is available. In addition to these, there are several websites in local dialects. Print journalism remains a popular news medium in Mizoram; local newspapers include Vanglaini and The Zozam Times. The Mizoram Post, an English-language daily newspaper published from Silchar (Assam) was the most circulated newspaper in Mizoram, in 2007.

Notable people
 
 
 Laldenga (d.1990) - freedom Fighter of Mizoram. Former Party leader of the Mizo National Front (MNF) and the first Chief Minister of Mizoram.
 Lalduhawma - politician and party president of the Zoram Nationalist Party (ZNP). Former Member of Parliament (Lok Sabha) for Mizoram.
 Jeje Lalpekhlua - Mizo Footballer. Player at the Indian Super League (ISL) and Hero I-League. Former Captain of the India national football team.
 Lalremsiami - hockey player representing India in several International Hockey Events.
 Jeremy Lalrinnunga - Mizo Weightlifter who win Gold in International Weightlifting event.
 Robert Lalthlamuana - Mizo Footballer. Player at the Indian Super League (ISL) and Hero I-League.
 Shylo Malsawmtluanga - Mizo Footballer. Former player at the Hero I-League. Current player of the Mizoram Premier League (MPL).
 Lalrindika Ralte - Mizo Footballer. Player at the Indian Super League (ISL) and Hero I-League. Currently the captain of East Bengal F.C.
 Nuchhungi Renthlei (d.2002) - founder of Girls' Auxiliary, a poet, a singer and a school teacher, the first Mizo woman to receive the Padma Shri award
 H. T. Sangliana, IPS Rtd. - a politician who was a member of the 14th Lok Sabha of India. He represented the Bangalore North Constituency of Karnataka from the BJP.
 Lalsangzuali Sailo (d.2006)- a singer, songwriter, poet, All India Radio "A" grade artist and a recipient of Padma Shree Award.
 Brig. T. Sailo (d.2015) - former Chief Minister of Mizoram. Former party leader of the Mizoram People's Conference (MPC)
 Lal Thanhawla - former Chief Minister of Mizoram and party leader of the Mizoram Congress Party.
 Ziona (d.2021) - a polygamous man with 38 wives and numerous children and grandchildren.
 Zoramthanga - present Chief Minister of Mizoram and current party leader of the Mizo National Front (MNF).
Jerry Mawihmingthanga - Mizo footballer who plays as a midfielder or winger for Odisha in the Indian Super League.

See also

 Outline of India
 Bibliography of India
 Mizo Hlakungpui Mual
 Mizo music

References

Further reading
B. Hamlet, Encyclopaedia of North-East India: Mizoram, Volume 5, 
C. Nunthara, Mizoram: Society and Polity, 
T. Raatan, Encyclopaedia of North-east India: Arunachal Pradesh Manipur Mizoram, 
Zoramdinthara, Mizo Fiction: Emergence and Development,

External links

Government
  
 Official Tourism Site of Mizoram

General information
 
 

 
States and union territories of India
Northeast India
English-speaking countries and territories
States and territories established in 1987
Tourism in Northeast India